Grupo Sanborns is a retailing arm of the Carlos Slim-run Grupo Carso that includes the namesake Sanborns chain, Mixup music stores, iShop electronics stores, Saks Fifth Avenue and Sears department stores in Mexico, and other formats. 

The namesake Sanborns chain began in the early 20th century as a transplant of the American coffee shop (diner) to Mexico City. Sanborns stores are not easily classified as a junior department store or any other format commonly found around the world, as they are known for their sit-down restaurants, and stores also usually have a cocktail bar, bakery, pharmacy, newsstand, books, CDs, and compact areas of department store-style merchandise such as cosmetics, candy, clothing and accessories, gifts, home decoration, luggage, small appliances, TVs, cellphones and accessories, laptops, tablets, and small electronics.

Sanborns are located across Mexico. Previous locations in El Salvador and Panama have since closed.

History

The retail company was founded in Mexico City on June 19, 1903, by California immigrants Walter and Frank Sanborn, who also opened Mexico's first soda fountain. The original location and its lunch counter, across from the main post office (Palacio de Correos de México) is still in operation.

During the Mexican Revolution, troops of Emiliano Zapata used a Sanborns branch located where the Libreria Madero is today, as a rendezvous point and gathering place. Extant photos show Zapatista soldiers enjoying their first restaurant meal at Sanborns' lunch counter. Thus the Sanborns slogan Meet me at Sanborns.

In 1919, Walter Sanborn, tired of Mexico's political turmoil, returned to the US and left the management of the company to his brother Frank.

The trademark of the franchise, the three owls, represent Mr. Frank Sanborn and his sons, Francis and Jonathan. For some time, the official name of the company was "Sanborn´s Hermanos" (Sanborn's Brothers), when Mr. Frank died.

Also in 1919, Sanborns acquired its most famous branch location, the 16th century House of Tiles, the Casa de los Azulejos, a major Mexico City tourist attraction and national monument. This is probably the world's only pharmacy decorated with a mural by José Clemente Orozco.

In 1946, Frank Sanborn sold his interest in Sanborns to fellow pharmacist Charles Walgreen Jr. of Chicago.

Like Walgreens, Sanborns does not use an apostrophe in its name. In Sanborns' case, it is due to the Spanish language not using apostrophes to indicate possession.

Walgreens sold its interest in 1985.

The Sanborns chain operates a full e-commerce website selling a wide range of merchandise from the categories found in its physical stores (gifts, cosmetics, electronics, etc.)

Due to a drop in sales caused by an economic downturn, Sanborns' three Central American stores closed in 2020. It’s only Panamanian branch closed in January of that year, having opened in 2007 at Multiplaza Panama at a cost of US$6 million. Its two stores in El Salvador at Metrocentro and Multiplaza, both in San Salvador, closed later that year.

Grupo Sanborns
Currently, Sanborns is a unit of Grupo Sanborns, the retailing arm of conglomerate Grupo Carso which itself is controlled by Carlos Slim, the fourth wealthiest billionaire in the world as of 2016. As of 2021 the group sales were 53 billion Mexican pesos, equivalent to around 2.6 billion USD. It operated in 62 metropolitan areas and towns across the country with 197 Sanborns restaurant-and-retail stores and Sanborns Cafés (stand-alone restaurants); 141 Mixup (music/video) and iShop (Apple reseller) stores, 97 Sears stores, and one Saks Fifth Avenue store.page 4, Grupo Sanborns 2021 annual report

References

External links
 Sanborns Official Site
 Megamart Official Site

Retail companies of Mexico
Conglomerate companies of Mexico
Pharmacies of Mexico
Restaurant chains in Mexico
Retail companies established in 1903
1903 establishments in Mexico
1999 initial public offerings
Economic history of Mexico
Carlos Slim
Sanborns